The 2013 V.League 2 (known as the Eximbank V.League 2 for sponsorship reasons) season was the 19th season of Vietnam's second tier professional football league that started on 9 March 2013.

QNK Quảng Nam won its first ever V.League 2 title on 29 June 2013 after defeating Than Quảng Ninh 4–2, taking the season series and securing the league title.

Teams 
A total of 10 teams will contest the league, including 9 sides from the 2012 season.

Relegation for Thành phố Hồ Chí Minh and XM Fico Tây Ninh to the 2013 Vietnamese Second Division was confirmed on the final matchday on 19 August 2012.

Hà Nội were to be promoted to the 2013 V-League season but returned to the league because they could not find a separate title sponsor than their parent club. TĐCS Đồng Tháp were relegated from the 2012 V-League season. Vicem Hải Phòng, who were relegated from the 2012 V-League season, will return to compete in the 2013 V-League season after purchasing the place of dissolved Khatoco Khánh Hòa.

Hà Nội B was dissolved on 27 November 2012 when club officials could not secure a new sponsor after the earlier arrest of Chairman Nguyen Duc Kien caused all sponsorship from his assets to be blocked.

SHB Đà Nẵng B and 2012 Vietnamese Second Division champions and runners-up, Bà Rịa–Vũng Tàu and Khatoco Khánh Hòa B, were officially dissolved at a league meeting on 8 December 2012.

The VPF decided to keep the number of participating clubs at 10, not promoting other clubs from the Vietnamese Second Division due to new league regulations on club management.

On 8 December 2012, the VPF had stated that the Vietnam U22 team would be added to the V-League to gain experience ahead of the 2013 Southeast Asian Games and to bring the participating number of clubs to 12. However, the Vietnam Football Federation announced on December 13, 2012, that 2012 Vietnamese First Division second runners-up Đồng Nai would be the twelfth club in the 2013 campaign.

XSKT Lâm Đồng officially withdraw.

Stadia and locations

Personnel and kits

Note: Flags indicate national team as has been defined under FIFA eligibility rules. Players and Managers may hold more than one non-FIFA nationality.

Managerial changes

Foreign players

Note:
1Those players who were born and started their professional career abroad but have since gained Vietnamese Residency;
2Foreign residents who have chosen to represent Vietnam national team;
3Vietnamese residents who have chosen to represent another national team

League table

Results

Season statistics

Top scorers

Scoring
First goal of the season: Uche Iheruome for Hùng Vương An Giang against Than Quảng Ninh (9 March 2013)
Fastest goal of the season: 1 minute, Nguyễn Mạnh Tuấn for Than Quảng Ninh against Hà Nội (30 March 2013)
Largest winning margin: 5 goals
Hà Nội 0–5 XSKT Cần Thơ (15 June 2013)
Highest scoring game(s): 10 goals
Hùng Vương An Giang 6-4 QNK Quảng Nam (6 July 2013)
Most goals scored in a match by a single team: 6 goals
Hùng Vương An Giang 6-4 QNK Quảng Nam (6 July 2013)
Most goals scored in a match by a losing team(s): 4 goals
Hùng Vương An Giang 6-4 QNK Quảng Nam (6 July 2013)

Clean sheets
Most clean sheets: 4
TĐCS Đồng Tháp
Fewest clean sheets: 0
TDC Bình Dương

Discipline
Most yellow cards (club): 26
Than Quảng Ninh
Most yellow cards (player): 5
Nguyễn Tuấn Anh (Than Quảng Ninh)
Most red cards (club): 3
Hà Nội
Most red cards (players): 1
Vũ Trọng Thông (Hùng Vương An Giang)
Nguyễn Hữu Tài (Bình Định)
Đỗ Trọng Hòa (XSKT Cần Thơ)
Trần Minh Sen (XSKT Cần Thơ)
Nguyễn Huy Hùng (Hà Nội)
Nguyễn Huỳnh Điệp (Hà Nội)
Triệu Văn Mạnh (Hà Nội)
Nguyễn Tuấn Anh (Than Quảng Ninh)

References

External links

Second level Vietnamese football league seasons
2
Viet
Viet